John Stephen Bazin (October 15, 1796–April 23, 1848) was the third Roman Catholic Bishop of Vincennes (now the Archdiocese of Indianapolis).

Life
Jean Etienne Bazin was born at Duerne, near Lyon, on October 15, 1796, the fourth of nine children of Jean-Antoine and Claudine (née Ville) Bazin. He was educated in his native country and ordained in Lyon Cathedral on July 22, 1822.

In November 1830, he arrived in the United States and began his labours among the Roman Catholics of Mobile, Alabama, where for seventeen years he toiled zealously for the religious instruction of the young, organizing the Sunday schools and establishing the Catholic Orphan Asylum Society. He was also the vicar-general of the diocese.

In 1846 at the request of Bishop Michael Portier, Bazin went to France to secure the services of the Society of Jesus for Spring Hill College of Mobile, Alabama, and of the Brothers of the Christian Schools for the Boys' Orphan Asylum. In both efforts he was successful.

When Célestine Guynemer de la Hailandière, Bishop of Vincennes, resigned his see in 1847, Bazin was consecrated his successor on the 24th of October of that year. His episcopal career, which promised to be one of great usefulness to the church, was cut short by his untimely death from pneumonia only seven months later.

Despite his short term as bishop, Bazin was able to heal some of the rifts that had formed in his diocese. He reassured Theodore Guerin that her congregation, the Sisters of Providence of Saint Mary-of-the-Woods, could continue despite numerous issues they had had with Bishop de la Hailandière, who had banished Guerin from the diocese and threatened excommunication.

In a letter to another bishop, Jean-Baptiste Bouvierr of Le Mans, Guerin described Bazin as "pious, humble, and of an amiable simplicity."

Bazin died at Vincennes, Indiana on April 23, 1848, and was interred in the Old Cathedral.

References 

 Catholic-Hierarchy.org data

1796 births
1848 deaths
French emigrants to the United States
19th-century Roman Catholic bishops in the United States
Roman Catholic Archdiocese of Mobile
Roman Catholic bishops of Vincennes
Religious leaders from Alabama
Burials at the St. Francis Xavier Cathedral and Library